Glycosylphosphatidylinositol anchor attachment 1 protein is a protein that in humans is encoded by the GPAA1 gene.

Posttranslational glycosylphosphatidylinositol (GPI) anchor attachment serves as a general mechanism for linking proteins to the cell surface membrane. The protein encoded by this gene presumably functions in GPI anchoring at the GPI transfer step. The mRNA transcript is ubiquitously expressed in both fetal and adult tissues. The anchor attachment protein 1 contains an N-terminal signal sequence, 1 cAMP- and cGMP-dependent protein kinase phosphorylation site, 1 leucine zipper pattern, 2 potential N-glycosylation sites, and 8 putative transmembrane domains.

Interactions 

GPAA1 has been shown to interact with PIGT and PIGK.

References

Further reading